The 17 cm Kanone 18 in Mörserlafette (English: 17 cm Cannon 18 on Mortar Carriage), abbreviated as 17 cm K 18 in MrsLaf was a German heavy gun used during World War II.

Design
The 17 cm K 18 in MrsLaf was a  towed gun with a barrel 50 calibres long.  The 17 cm K 18 in MrsLaf shared the same box trail carriage with the 21 cm Mörser 18. The carriage allowed transport of the weapon over short distances in one piece, whilst for longer distances the barrel was removed from the carriage and transported separately.  A series of ramps and winches made removing the barrel a reasonably quick task for its time, but still required several hours. For all of the gun's bulk, a full 360-degree traverse could be achieved by two men.

Dual-recoil mechanism
A notable innovation by Krupp on the 21 cm Mörser 18 and the 17 cm Kanone 18 was the "double recoil" or dual-recoil carriage. The normal recoil forces were initially taken up by a conventional recoil mechanism close to the barrel, and then by a carriage sliding along rails set inside the travelling carriage. The dual-recoil mechanism absorbed all of the recoil energy with virtually no movement of the box trail upon firing, thus making for a very accurate weapon.

Ammunition
Projectiles
The 17 cm K 18 in MrsLaf fired three types of separately loaded ammunition.

Shell performance
The 17 cm K 18 in MrsLaf separately loaded ammunition used four charges.  The gun's performance when firing the  17cm K Gr 38 Hb long-range shell is depicted in the following table:

History
In 1939 the 21 cm Mörser 18 began appearing in the Wehrmacht corps-level artillery regiments, replacing the obsolescent World War I-era 21 cm Mörser 16.

The 17 cm K 18 in MrsLaf quickly impressed German artillery officers with its range, but the real surprise was the explosive power of the  shell, which was little different from the  shell of the 21 cm Mörser 18. Production commenced in 1941. In 1942 production of the 21 cm Mörser 18 was halted for almost two years so as to allow maximum production of the Kanone 18.

Operational history
The 17 cm K 18 in MrsLaf was employed at the corps and army echelons in order to provide long-range counter-battery support, as well as filling the same basic heavy support role as the 21 cm Mörser 18, the pair becoming the most common weapons used by the Wehrmacht in this role.  In 1944 some Allied batteries used captured 17 cm K 18 in MrsLafs when ammunition supplies for their usual guns were disrupted by the long logistical chain from Normandy to the German border.

The 17 cm K 18 in MrsLaf was considered a technically excellent long range artillery piece for the German Army, with excellent range and a very effective shell.  The gun's greatest weaknesses were that it was expensive to build and required careful maintenance.  Additionally, it was quite slow to bring in and out of action, fairly difficult to maneuver and very slow to move off-road. Many were lost when their crews abandoned them when fleeing advancing Allied forces.

Gallery

See also

 17 cm Kanone in Eisenbahnlafette – railway gun of same calibre
 M107 self-propelled gun – post-war US gun of similar calibre

References

External links
 Military Factory, "17cm Kanone 18 (17cm K18)", militaryfactory.com, retrieved 29 June 2018.

World War II artillery of Germany
173 mm artillery
Weapons and ammunition introduced in 1941